The Dongshi Natural Ecological Exhibition Center is a science center in Dongshi Township, Chiayi County, Taiwan.

Architecture
The center is housed in a 2-story building.

Exhibitions
The center exhibits the history and introduction to rural villages, fishing tools and wetland ecology.

See also
 Aogu Wetland

References

Buildings and structures in Chiayi County
Science centers in Taiwan
Tourist attractions in Chiayi County